MSC Industrial Direct Co., Inc (MSC), through its subsidiaries, primarily, MSC Industrial Supply Co., it is one of the largest industrial equipment distributors in the United States, distributing more than 1.5 million metalworking and other industrial products.  MSC is most famous for publishing "The Big Book", a catalog totaling over 3,000 pages detailing the company's products, which currently number over 1 million.

MSC was founded in 1941 as Sid Tool, Inc., by Sidney Jacobson, in New York's Little Italy.  It originally sold cutting tools and accessories to New York City machine shops. The company later moved its headquarters to Plainview, NY. 

In 1970, Manhattan Supply Company was acquired and, in 1998, moved to its current headquarters in Melville, New York.

The company currently operates from five regional Customer Fulfillment Centers and 85 branch offices. 

On June 8, 2006, MSC completed the acquisition of J & L America, Inc. DBA J & L Industrial Supply (J & L), a subsidiary of Kennametal, for $349.5 million.

In 2013 the company opened its co-headquarters office in Davidson, North Carolina which is located in the Charlotte, North Carolina metropolitan area. The company has expanded to 750 employees at the co-headquarters, with 120 employees making the move to the Carolinas from the Melville office.

References

External links

Industrial supply companies
Distribution companies of the United States
Companies based in Suffolk County, New York
Companies listed on the New York Stock Exchange